Shree Krishna Shrestha (April 19, 1967 – August 10, 2014) was a Nepalese actor and producer known for his work in Nepali cinema. One of the most popular and celebrated stars of Nepali Cinema, Shrestha is renowned for his talents as an actor and dancer and was one of the highest-earning actors in Nepali cinema history.

Shrestha made his acting debut with Bhumari, which was successful in box office. Since then he has worked in commercially successful films like Maiti, Bar Pipal, Aafno Manche, Gorkhali, A Mero Hajur, Upakar, Sukha Dukha and record-breaking all-time blockbusters, Hami Tin Bhai, Kaha Bhetiyela and Kohinoor. He was also the producer of the later two.

Personal life 
Shree Krishna Shrestha married Shweta Khadka in July 2014. They met when she made her film debut in Kaha Bhetiyela, a Nepali movie which he produced. The two had been in a relationship for a long time when they married on July 7, 2014.

Illness and death 
Shrestha and his wife Shweta Khadka travelled to India shortly after their marriage, where his health began to decline. He was diagnosed with pneumonia and bone cancer. He died at the age of 47 in Sir Ganga Ram Hospital, New Delhi, on 10 August 2014 at 5am local time. Thousands of people participated in the funeral proceeding in Kathmandu. He was given a national honor by the Nepal Government. Many personalities of Nepal, including the prime minister of Nepal, expressed their deep condolences to him.

Partial filmography

References

External links

1967 births
2014 deaths
Actors from Kathmandu
Deaths from pneumonia in India
Nepalese male film actors
21st-century Nepalese male actors
20th-century Nepalese male actors